The Department of Brain and Cognitive Sciences at the Massachusetts Institute of Technology, Cambridge, Massachusetts, United States, engages in fundamental research in the areas of brain and neural systems, and cognitive processes. The department is within the School of Science at the MIT and began initially as the Department of Psychology founded by the psychologist Hans-Lukas Teuber in 1964. In 1986 the MIT Department of Psychology merged with the Whittaker College integrating Psychology and Neuroscience research to form the Department of Brain and Cognitive Sciences.

Research 

The department aims to understand the basic processes of intelligence and brain processes. It has four main themes of research:

Molecular and Cellular Neuroscience This deals with biology of neurons and cellular physiology.
Systems Neuroscience This deals with developing models of cognitive processes at the neural level. This includes developing algorithms and mathematical models of neural activity.
Cognitive Science This engages in the research of mind through the interdisciplinary approaches of psychology, computer science, mathematics and linguistics for the experimental analysis and mathematical modeling of cognitive processes. The Department of Brain and Cognitive Sciences works in collaboration with the McGovern Institute and the Picower Institute, also at the MIT.
Computation This deals with the development of theoretical models that explains the processes of memory, language and reasoning using computer simulations and computational models.

The Department of Brain and Cognitive Sciences work in close collaboration with the Artificial Intelligence Laboratory and the Computer Science department and the Centre for Biological and Computational Learning at the MIT.

Researchers
The Department of Brain and Cognitive Sciences has had several prominent scientists. These include:

See also
 McGovern Institute
 Picower Institute

References

Massachusetts Institute of Technology
Cognitive science research institutes
Neuroscience research centers in the United States
Research institutes in Massachusetts
Psychology institutes
Cognitive science